Jewels is an album by American country music singer and songwriter Waylon Jennings, released in 1968 on RCA Victor.

Background
Jennings, who had enjoyed his biggest hit yet with the #2 hit country single "Only Daddy That'll Walk the Line" in 1968, followed it with the Top 5 hit "Yours Love," which was written by Harlan Howard and included on Jewels, Waylon's ninth LP for RCA.  The album is also significant for featuring two songs composed by Merle Haggard, who was recording for Capitol with producer Ken Nelson in Los Angeles and enjoying a degree of musical autonomy that Jennings was pining for in Nashville.   In his 2008 book Willie Nelson, author Joe Nick Patoski observes that "the more records Waylon made and the more he understood how the system worked, the less he appreciated what RCA thought was best for him.  As his record sales increased, his complaints grew louder.  The Nashville Sound was cramping his style."

The album also includes Mel Tillis' "Mental Revenge," which hit #12 for Jennings in 1967.

Track listing
"New York City, RFD" (Larry Collins, Alice Joy)
"Today I Started Loving You Again" (Merle Haggard, Bonnie Owens)
"Folsom Prison Blues" (Johnny Cash)
"If You Were Mine to Lose" (Mickey Jaco)
"See You Around (On Your Way Down)" (Harlan Howard)
"Six Strings Away" (Waylon Jennings)
"Yours Love" (Howard)
"How Much Rain Can One Man Stand" (Dallas Frazier)
"Mental Revenge" (Mel Tillis)
"I'm Doing This for You" (Hank Cochran)
"You Love the Ground I Walk On" (Howard, Don McHan)
"My Ramona" (Haggard)

Waylon Jennings albums
J
RCA Victor albums
Albums produced by Chet Atkins